One Liberty Observation Deck, also called Philly From The Top, was an  high observation deck located on the 57th floor of One Liberty Place in Center City, Philadelphia. As of September 2021 the deck is closed permanently as a result of the COVID-19 pandemic.

History

Paris-based Montparnasse 56 Group (M56) announced in 2014 that it would open an observation deck on the 57th floor of One Liberty Place. The One Liberty Observation Deck, also called Philly from the Top, opened to the public on November 28, 2015. The observation deck is fully enclosed and offers 360 degree panoramic views of the city from 883 feet above street level, which was the highest public access level and the tallest standing building attraction in Philadelphia as of 2016.

On September 15, 2020, the One Liberty Observation Deck suspended operations indefinitely due to a decline in visitors caused by the COVID-19 pandemic.

Concept
The attraction consists of three levels, the ground floor entry area, a second floor ticketing, lobby and gift shop area, and the 57th floor observation area. After purchasing a ticket, visitors may choose to stand in front of a green screen to have a photograph taken. Visitors then board an elevator where a video with surround sound is presented about the observation deck and the city. Once on the 57th floor, visitors enter an area with tables, seating and vending machines. The observation area completely encircles the building core with windows in all directions. Multiple interactive maps with electronic sight-seeing tours are available throughout the observation deck.

References

External links

Official website
One Liberty Observation Deck at Visitphilly.com

History of Philadelphia
Observation decks